GBJ may refer to:

 Jersey, a British Crown Dependency (licence plate code)
 Marie-Galante Airport, Guadeloupe (IATA code)
 Gutob language (ISO 639-3 code)